The Bamberg Historic District, located in the city and county of Bamberg, South Carolina, is an important collection of over 50 mostly residential buildings. The homes were constructed from 1880–1930, and are representative of the residential neighborhoods of the period.  A cemetery dating to 1852 is also in the district.  The Bamberg Historic District was listed in the National Register of Historic Places on May 19, 1983.

References

Victorian architecture in South Carolina
Geography of Bamberg County, South Carolina
Buildings and structures in Bamberg County, South Carolina
National Register of Historic Places in Bamberg County, South Carolina
Historic districts on the National Register of Historic Places in South Carolina